Santosh Sivan (born 8 February 1964) is an Indian cinematographer, film director, producer and actor known for his works in Malayalam, Tamil and Hindi cinema. Santosh graduated from the Film and Television Institute of India and has to date completed 55 feature films and 50 documentaries.
He is regarded as one of India's finest and best cinematographers. He Has Won Twelve National Film Awards, Six Filmfare Awards, Four Kerala State Film Awards and Three Tamil Nadu State Film Awards respectively.

Career

Santosh, a founding member of the Indian Society of Cinematographers and the most awarded Director of Photography in India, graduated from the Film and Television Institute of India and completed 45 feature films and 41 documentaries.

As a director, Santosh won his first National Award in 1988 for the Story of Tiblu (1988). His film Halo was honoured at the 43rd National Film Awards as the Best Children's Film and Best Sound.

Santosh became the first cinematographer in the Asia-Pacific region to join the American Society of Cinematographers membership. As a cinematographer, he has won five National Film Awards – including four for Best Feature Film Cinematography. As of 2014, he has received eleven National Film Awards, and 21 international awards for his works. He was awarded the Padma Shri for his contributions to Indian cinema in 2014.

Late 1999s and present

In an interview, he said that some films he chose, not mostly because of the story but due to the very fact that he was comfortable with the director, a bigger pay cut and friendship things.

Documentary

His 2007 release Prarambha won the National Film Award for Best Educational/Motivational/Instructional Film at the 55th National Film Awards.

Filmography

As actor

Awards

National Film Awards

Kerala State Film Awards
 1992 – Aham – Best Cinematography (Colour)
1994 – Pavithram – Best Cinematography
 1996 – Kalapani – Best Cinematography
 2005 – Anandabhadram – Best Cinematography

Tamil Nadu State Film Awards
 1992 – Roja – Best Cinematography
 1996 – Indira – Best Cinematography
 2010 – Raavanan – Best Cinematography

Filmfare Awards
 1995 – Barsaat – Best Cinematography
 1998 – Dil Se.. – Best Cinematography
 2000 – Halo – Best Film (Critics)
 2001 – Asoka – Best Cinematography

Filmfare Awards South
 1997 – Iruvar – Best Cinematographer – South
 1999 – Vanaprastham – Best Cinematographer – South

IIFA Awards
 2002 – Asoka – IFFA Best Cinematographer Award

Star Screen Awards
 2005 – Meenaxi: A Tale of Three Cities – Best Cinematography

Zee Cine Awards
 2005 – Meenaxi: A Tale of Three Cities – Best Cinematography

International
Won:

1998 – The Terrorist – Best Director at Cairo International Film Festival
1998 – The Terrorist – Golden Pyramid at Cairo International Film Festival
1999 – Malli – Adult's Jury Award for Feature Film and Video (second place) at Chicago International Film Festival
1999 – The Terrorist – Grand Jury Prize at Cinemanila International Film Festival
1999 – The Terrorist – Lino Brocka Award for Best Film at Cinemanila International Film Festival
2000 – Malli– Poznan Goat for Best Director at 18th Ale Kino! International Young Audience Film Festival
2000 – The Terrorist – Panorama Jury Prize for Honorable Mention at Sarajevo Film Festival
2000 – Malli – Emerging Masters Showcase Award at Seattle International Film Festival Awards
2004 – Malli – Audience Award for Best Feature Film at Indian Film Festival of Los Angeles
2005 – Navarasa – Monaco International Film Festival (Monaco)
 Won – Best Supporting Actor – Bobby Darling
 Won – Angel Independent Spirit Award – Navarasa – Santosh Sivan
2008 – Before the Rains – Grand Award for Best Theatrical Feature at WorldFest Houston International Film Festival
2008 – Before the Rains – Crystal Kodak award for best cinematography.
2009 – Tahaan won a High Commendation in Children's Feature Film section at the 2009 Asia Pacific Screen Awards
Nominated:

2001 – The Terrorist – Independent Spirit Award for Best Foreign Film
2001 – The Terrorist – Phoenix Film Critics Society Award for Best Foreign Language Film

References

External links

Official website
Official Facebook
Santosh Sivan's blog on PassionForCinema.com

Director with a Focus
Shana Maria Verghis of The Daily Pioneer (India) Interviews Santosh Sivan

Loyola School, Thiruvananthapuram alumni
Malayalam film directors
Film directors from Thiruvananthapuram
1964 births
Living people
Film and Television Institute of India alumni
Tamil film cinematographers
Kerala State Film Award winners
Malayalam film cinematographers
Tamil Nadu State Film Awards winners
Malayalam film producers
Best Cinematography National Film Award winners
Recipients of the Padma Shri in arts
Filmfare Awards South winners
20th-century Indian film directors
Filmfare Awards winners
Film producers from Thiruvananthapuram
21st-century Indian film directors
Screenwriters from Thiruvananthapuram
20th-century Indian dramatists and playwrights
21st-century Indian dramatists and playwrights
20th-century Indian photographers
21st-century Indian photographers
21st-century Indian male actors
Male actors from Thiruvananthapuram
Male actors in Malayalam cinema
Male actors in Tamil cinema
Indian male film actors
Cinematographers from Kerala
Directors who won the Best Children's Film National Film Award
Directors who won the Best Film on Environment Conservation/Preservation National Film Award